Uche Agba (born 24 June 1986) is a Nigerian professional footballer who plays as a forward for Malaysia Super League club PDRM.

References

External links
 

Living people
1986 births
Nigerian footballers
Nigerian expatriate footballers
Expatriate footballers in Malaysia
Association football forwards
Heartland F.C. players
CS Sfaxien players
Al-Qadsiah FC players
Melaka United F.C. players
Sarawak United FC players
Malaysia Premier League players
Sportspeople from Lagos